The Hamza Division (Firqat al-Hamza) was a Syrian rebel group affiliated with the Free Syrian Army. It was based in Inkhil, Daraa Governorate. It was formed on 8 April 2013 by Colonel Saber Safar as the "Hamza Brigade". It was composed of six subunits. The group received U.S.-made BGM-71 TOW anti-tank missiles. It was a member of the Daraa Military Council and the Southern Front.

History
The group joined the First Army on 1 January 2015. In mid-2015 the 1st Army disbanded, although the Hamza Division continued to use its imagery until 2016.

On 22 September 2016, 9 commanders in the Hamza Division were assassinated in a bombing in Inkhil.

See also
List of armed groups in the Syrian Civil War

References

Anti-government factions of the Syrian civil war
2013 establishments in Syria
Anti-ISIL factions in Syria